PP-97 Faisalabad-I is a Constituency of Provincial Assembly of Punjab.

Election 2013, Azad Ali Tabassum of Pakistan Muslim League (Nawaz) won the seat of MPA from PP – 51 FAISALABAD I by collecting 39, 676. 
Muhammad Ajmal Cheema of Pakistan Tehreek-e-Insaf place second by taking 22,342 votes in PP – 51 FAISALABAD I.
For 2018 General elections the new constituencies were made and PP-51 was named as Gujranwala-1. In 2018, General Elections Shaukat Manzoor Cheema of Pakistan Muslim League (Nawaz) won the seat and became the member of Provisional Assembly of Punjab. Due to the demise of PML-N parliamentarian the seat was vacant and a by-election was conducted on 19th February 2021 in which Tallat Mehmood of Pakistan Muslim League (Nawaz) won the election by securing 53,903 votes.

General elections 2013

General elections 2008

See also
 PP-96 Chiniot-IV
 PP-98 Faisalabad-II

References

External links
 Election commission Pakistan's official website
 Awazoday.com check result
 Official Website of Government of Punjab

Provincial constituencies of Punjab, Pakistan